Statistics of Latvian Higher League in the 1937–38 season.

Overview
It was contested by 7 teams, and Olimpija won the championship.

League standings

References
RSSSF

Latvian Higher League seasons
1937 in Latvian football
1938 in Latvian football
Latvia